The Reading Rebels are a professional basketball team in Reading, Pennsylvania, and members of The Basketball League (TBL).

History

On March 1, 2021 it was announced that Reading, Pennsylvania would be awarded a franchise for the upcoming 2022 TBL season. 

On November 24, 2021, a press conference occurred where it was officially announced that Co-team market owners Jonathan Gross, President/General Manager, Alex Bernhard, Director of Player Development/Assistant General Manager, and Merritt Marable, Executive VP of Basketball Operations.

References

Sports in Reading, Pennsylvania
Basketball teams in Pennsylvania
Basketball teams established in 2021
The Basketball League teams